Guitar Beat is the debut album by the neo-surf band the Raybeats. It was released in 1981 and produced by Martin Rushent. The album features ten original instrumentals, plus a Jan and Dean cover.

In tongue-in-cheek fashion, the original LP sleeve characterized the first side as the "listless, spotty & wasteful side" and the second as the "brave, clean & reverent side". The record sleeve also featured on the front a hand-colored photo of the band by photographer Laura Levine.

Reception 

AllMusic called it "a magnificent, echo-drenched set of concise and atmospheric riff-driven tunes that in a better world would have turned up as the soundtrack for a James Bond movie directed by David Lynch."

Track listing
All compositions by Pat Irwin, Jody Harris, Don Christensen and George Scott III except as indicated.

Side one
"Tight Turn"  
"Big Black Sneakers" 
"Tone Zone" 
"The Backstroke" (Irwin, Harris, Christensen)
"B-Gas Rickshaw" (Jan Berry)
"International Operator"

Side two
"Searching" 
"The Calhoun Surf" (Danny Amis)
"Piranha Salad" 
"Cocktails" (Irwin, Harris, Christensen)
"Guitar Beat" (Irwin, Harris, Scott, Amis)

Personnel
Jody Harris - electric guitar
Danny Amis - bass, guitar
Pat Irwin - alto saxophone, organ, guitar
Don Christensen - drums

References 

1981 debut albums
Albums produced by Martin Rushent
Passport Records albums